Plevna is an unincorporated community and census-designated place in southeastern Knox County, Missouri, United States. As of the 2020 census, its population was 7.

Plevna was platted in 1877. According to author and name historian Robert Ramsay, the community is named after Plevna, Bulgaria, site of a Russian victory at the Siege of Plevna during the Russo-Turkish War. A post office was established at Plevna in 1877.

Demographics

References 

Unincorporated communities in Knox County, Missouri
Unincorporated communities in Missouri
Census-designated places in Missouri